This unit was born in 1986 from the Center of Studies and Research on Aeronautical Medicine. It is part of ITAF’s Division for studies and research and is located in the ITAF Base at Pratica di Mare, near Rome. Its three branches (General pathology, Hygiene and immunology, Psycho physiology) achieved success in research on: vaccines, circadian rhythms, claustrophobia, remote monitoring and drugs to optimise performances.

Aeronautics organizations
Italian Air Force
Italian medical research
Organizations established in 1986
Space science organizations
1986 establishments in Italy
Scientific organisations based in Italy